Milán Földes (born 9 April 1993 in Székesfehérvár) is a Hungarian professional footballer who plays for FC Dabas.

Club statistics

Updated to games played as of 4 March 2014.

References

MLSZ 

1993 births
Living people
Sportspeople from Székesfehérvár
Hungarian footballers
Association football defenders
Kaposvári Rákóczi FC players
Nemzeti Bajnokság I players